Inside Job is the fourth solo studio album by Don Henley, the lead vocalist and drummer for the Eagles. The album was released through the Warner Bros. record label on May 23, 2000, the album was Henley's last album of all-new material until the release of Cass County in 2015.

The song "Goodbye to a River" was apparently named after the book of the same title by John Graves.  In the album's liner notes Henley wrote: "Respect and gratitude to fellow Texan, John Graves, for his inspirational writing - Goodbye to a River (1960) and other books." The album was the first solo album for Henley in 11 years, the album reached #7 on the charts and released two Adult Contemporary Tracks singles with "Taking You Home", and "Everything's Different Now". "Taking You Home" was also released as a single, and on the Billboard Hot 100, it peaked at #58.

Reception

Critical
Reviewing for AllMusic, critic Stephen Thomas Erlewine wrote of the album, "Inside Job lacks the melodic craftsmanship that made Building the Perfect Beast a blockbuster, and it isn't as focused as The End of the Innocence, but it is a solid comeback record from an artist who spent a little too long out of the spotlight."

Commercial
The album debuted on the Billboard 200 at No. 7 on its release in May 2000, then Henley's highest charting album. It was certified Platinum by the RIAA on July 12, 2000. The album has sold 1,124,000 copies in the US as of September 2015.

Track listing

Personnel 
Musicians
 Don Henley
 Michael Fisher (1, 4, 5, 8, 10, 13)
 Glenn Frey (1)
 Randy Jackson (1, 5, 10)
 Danny Kortchmar (1, 10)
 Stan Lynch (1, 2, 3, 5-11, 13)
 Jai Winding (1, 6, 10, 13)
 Stevie Wonder (1)
 Stuart Brawley (2, 3, 7, 8, 9, 11)
 Don Felder (2)
 David Paich (2)
 Dean Parks (3)
 Benmont Tench (3-6, 8, 9, 10)
 Mike Campbell (4, 7, 8)
 Scott F. Crago (4)
 Timothy Drury (4)
 Gregg Bissonette (5)
 Frank Simes (5, 10)
 Jebin Bruni (7)
 Lance Morrison (7)
 Stevie Gurr (8)
 Larry Klein (8)
 Tim Pierce (8)
 Bob Glaub (9)
 Steuart Smith (9)
 Jimmie Vaughan (10)
 John Corey (12)
 Randy Newman – string arrangements and conductor (12)

Backing vocals
 Don Henley – lead vocals 
 Stevie Wonder (1)
 Dorian Holley (2, 5, 11)
 Darryl Phinnessee (2)
 Mervyn Warren (2, 5, 11)
 Josef Powell (4)
 Carmen Twillie (4)
 Julia Waters (4)
 Luther Waters (4)
 Maxine Willard Waters (4)
 Oren Waters (4)
 Mona Lisa Young (4)
 Terry Young (4)
 Kevin Dorsey (5, 11)
 Michael Mishaw (5, 11)
 Kipp Lennon (7)
 Mark Lennon (7)
 Michael Lennon (7)
 Pat Lennon (7)
 Jana Anderson (10)
 Valerie Carter (10)

Production 
 Don Henley – producer 
 Stan Lynch – producer 
 Rob Jacobs – recording, mixing 
 Stuart Brawley – additional recording 
 Andy Ackland – assistant engineer
 Dave Ashton – assistant engineer
 Charlie Bouis – assistant engineer
 Andy Haller – assistant engineer 
 Daniel Mendez – assistant engineer
 Adam Olmstead – assistant engineer
 Roger Sommers – assistant engineer 
 Jeff Thomas – assistant engineer 
 Ken Villeneuve – assistant engineer
 Ted Barela – technical support
 Joe Birkman – technical support
 Steve Griffin – technical support
 Dave Hecht – technical support
 Bill Kaylor – technical support
 Art Kelm – technical support
 Stewart Whitmore – digital editing
 Stephen Marcussen – mastering
 Stephen Walker – art direction, design 
 Dennis Keeley – front cover photography, additional photography 
 Matthew Welch – additional photography 
 Irving Azoff – management 

Studios
 Recorded at Record Plant (Los Angeles, California); Royaltone Studios (North Hollywood, California); Samhain Sound (Malibu, California); Jai Winding Studios (Santa Monica, California); LeMobile and ASC Sumet Studios (Dallas, Texas).
 Mixed at One on One Studios (North Hollywood, California) and Record Plant.
 Edited and Mastered at Marcussen Mastering (Hollywood, California).

Chart history

Weekly charts

Year-end charts

References

Don Henley albums
2000 albums
Warner Records albums